Venugopalaswamy Temple, Ganapathy is a Vaishnavite temple in the neighbourhood viz., Ganapathy, in Coimbatore district in Tamil Nadu of India. The neighbourhood Ganapathy was named so, on the basis of a Ganapathy temple, viz., Kottai Ganapathy which was built 1,000 years ago, in front of this temple.

Location 
Under the control of Hindu Religious and Charitable Endowments Department of Government of Tamil Nadu,

Temple History 
The King of Mysore, of Yadava heritage, made arrangements to construct this temple, 1,000 years ago. Renovations were made in the year 1764 by King of Madaya Udayar heritage.

Information on poojas 
Ko pooja in between 6:00 a.m. and 06:15 a m.
Kaalasandhi pooja in between 6:00 a.m. and 7:00 a.m.
Uchchikkaala pooja in between 12 noon and 12:30 p.m.

References 

Hindu temples in Tamil Nadu
Hindu temples in Coimbatore district